Plouvain is a commune in the Pas-de-Calais department in the Hauts-de-France region of France.

Geography
The junction of the A1 and the A26 autoroutes is less than a mile away.

Population

Places of interest
 The church of St. Anne, rebuilt along with the rest of the village, after World War I.
 The Commonwealth War Graves Commission burials.

See also
Communes of the Pas-de-Calais department

References

External links
 The CWGC graves in the communal cemetery

Communes of Pas-de-Calais